Dudley Station Historic District is a historic district on Washington, Warren, and Dudley Streets in the Roxbury neighborhood of Boston, Massachusetts, United States.  The central feature of the district is Dudley Square station (now Nubian station), a Beaux Arts/French Renaissance structure designed by Alexander Wadsworth Longfellow and built by the Boston Elevated Railway (BERy, a predecessor of the MBTA) in 1901.  It is one of the best-preserved BERy stations remaining.

The district was added to the National Register of Historic Places in 1985.

See also
National Register of Historic Places listings in southern Boston, Massachusetts

References

Historic districts in Suffolk County, Massachusetts
Roxbury, Boston
National Register of Historic Places in Boston
Historic districts on the National Register of Historic Places in Massachusetts